Vishnyeva (Višnieva; , Vishnevo; ; ; , Vishneve) is an agrotown in the Valozhyn District of Minsk Region, Belarus, near the border with Lithuania.

History

The town was probably established in the 14th century. In 1859, it had 72 households, totalling 900 people, of which 500 were Jews. In 1897, it had a population of 2650, including the rural neighbourhood, of which 1463 were Jews. The population of Vishnyeva in 1907 was 2,650, of which 1,863 were Jews. In World War II, the Vishnyeva Ghetto included 1,100 men, women, children and infants, and all were burnt alive by the Nazis and their local collaborators in the Vishnyeva Synagogue on 22 September 1942. Among those killed on that day was the grandfather of Shimon Peres, who later became President of Israel. Some Jews were taken to the ghetto in the nearby town of Valozhyn and killed there. Remains of a Jewish cemetery can be located in the town. A few survivors have emigrated to Israel and to other countries.

People

The small town was the place of death of Symon Budny. Four centuries later, it was the birthplace of Shimon Peres, the former President of Israel, who emigrated to Mandatory Palestine with his family in 1934, 
Vishnyeva was also the birthplace of Yehoshua Rabinovitz, who served as the Finance Minister of the State of Israel and the Mayor of Tel-Aviv; of Nahum Goldman, who was the founder and president of the World Jewish Congress, and of the Dudman family, of which Yadin Dudai is an internationally renowned leader in neuroscience.

Landmarks 
 Church of Saint Mary, built in 1637—1641, is an example of Baroque style and listed as Belarus Cultural Heritage object.

References

Further reading

External links

 Vishnevo at KehilaLinks
 
 The Shtetl and I

Populated places in Minsk Region
Valozhyn District
Vilnius Voivodeship
Oshmyansky Uyezd
Nowogródek Voivodeship (1919–1939)
Holocaust locations in Belarus